Janet Shaw may refer to:
 Janet Shaw (cyclist)
 Janet Shaw (actress)